Carl Hansen (21 January 1887 – 16 July 1953) was a Danish wrestler. He competed in the featherweight event at the 1912 Summer Olympics.

References

External links
 

1887 births
1953 deaths
Olympic wrestlers of Denmark
Wrestlers at the 1912 Summer Olympics
Danish male sport wrestlers
Sportspeople from Copenhagen
20th-century Danish people